Biological Communications is a quarterly peer-reviewed scientific journal subsidized and published by St. Petersburg University Press (Saint Petersburg State University). It covers research in all areas of the biological sciences. The editor-in-chief is Pavel P. Skutschas (Saint Petersburg State University).

The journal Vestnik of Leningrad University. Biology was established in 1946. Starting in 1953 it was split into several sections. The biology section (Vestnik of Saint Petersburg University. Series 3. Biology; Russian: Вестник Санкт-Петербургского университета. Серия 3. Биология) was established in 1956 and received its current title in 2017.

The journal is abstracted and indexed in BIOSIS Previews, Russian Science Citation Index, and The Zoological Record.

References

External links

English-language journals
Biology journals
Quarterly journals
Publications established in 1956
Saint Petersburg State University